Hedwig Traindl (born 5 October 1934) is an Austrian gymnast. She competed in seven events at the 1952 Summer Olympics.

References

1934 births
Living people
Austrian female artistic gymnasts
Olympic gymnasts of Austria
Gymnasts at the 1952 Summer Olympics
Place of birth missing (living people)
20th-century Austrian women